Ryan Andrew Boldt (born November 22, 1994) is an American professional baseball outfielder who is a free agent. He previously played college baseball for the Nebraska Cornhuskers of the University of Nebraska–Lincoln and played professionally for the Tampa Bay Rays organization.

Amateur career
Boldt is naturally left-handed, but taught himself to throw with his right arm after having surgery to repair a broken radial head in his left elbow at the age of 10. He attended Red Wing High School in Red Wing, Minnesota, where he played for the school's baseball team. He joined the varsity team in his sophomore season, but required further surgeries on his arm. In the fall of 2012, Boldt was named the most valuable player of the Perfect Game High School All-American Classic, and competed on the United States national baseball team in the 2012 18U Baseball World Championship, winning the gold medal. He suffered a partial tear in the meniscus of his right knee in the first game of his senior season, causing him to miss the remainder of the year. The Boston Red Sox selected him in the 22nd round, with the 653rd selection, of the 2013 Major League Baseball draft. Though the Red Sox flew Boldt to Boston in an attempt to sign him, Boldt opted not to sign, and instead enrolled at the University of Nebraska–Lincoln to play college baseball for the Nebraska Cornhuskers.

Boldt serves as the leadoff hitter for the Cornhuskers. In 2015, his sophomore year, he was named to the All-Big Ten Conference's second team. After the 2015 season, he played collegiate summer baseball with the Bourne Braves of the Cape Cod Baseball League, and was named a league all-star. In 2016, Boldt was named to the Golden Spikes Award watch list, and ranked as one of the best prospects available in the 2016 Major League Baseball draft. However, he slumped in the 2016 season, batting .208 over his last 25 games.

Professional career
The Tampa Bay Rays selected Boldt in the second round of the 2016 draft. Boldt signed with the Rays, and spent his first professional season with the Hudson Valley Renegades of the Class A-Short Season New York-Penn League, where he posted a .218 batting average with one home run and 15 RBIs in 43 games. Boldt spent 2017 with the Charlotte Stone Crabs of the Class A-Advanced Florida State League, batting .295 with five home runs and 62 RBIs in 120 games. He began the 2018 season with the Montgomery Biscuits of the Class AA Southern League.

Boldt missed the 2019 season due to Tommy John surgery, and the minor league season was cancelled in 2020 due to the COVID-19 pandemic. In 2021, he began the season with the Durham Bulls. He was released from the Bulls in August 2022.

Personal life
Boldt has three older siblings. His cousin, Pat Kelly, played some baseball for the Cornhuskers.

References

External links

1994 births
Living people
People from Red Wing, Minnesota
Baseball players from Minnesota
Baseball outfielders
Nebraska Cornhuskers baseball players
Bourne Braves players
Hudson Valley Renegades players
Charlotte Stone Crabs players
Montgomery Biscuits players
Peoria Javelinas players
Durham Bulls players
Rochester Honkers players